The Washington Huskies volleyball team is the intercollegiate women's volleyball team of the University of Washington in Seattle.  They compete in the Pac-12 Conference and play their home games at Alaska Airlines Arena at Hec Edmundson Pavilion, which was built  in 1927 and renovated in 2000. Prior to 1988, the Washington volleyball program had seen Huskies' victories, but it has now emerged as a perennial power. The Huskies have reached the NCAA Final Four on five occasions with one national title (2005), and won multiple Pac-10/12 championships.

Head coaching
 1974–1975: Joyce Johnson
 1976–1977: Carol Garringer 
 1978–1983: Steve Suttich
 1984–1987: Lindy Vivas
 1988–1991: Debbie Buse
 1991–2000: Bill Neville
 2001–2014: Jim McLaughlin
 2015–2022: Keegan Cook

1980's AIAW team finished 28–12 with Lisa Baughn being named the All-American.

1988 was a significant year for the Husky VB Program. This year the team made its first NCAA tournament, elite eight appearance.  Behind the leadership of its first ever AVCA 1st Team All-American Laurie Wetzel (Puyallup, WA), the lady Huskies finished tied for fifth having beaten Stanford though coming up short against the UCLA Bruins.

USA National Team coach Bill Neville (UW: 1991–2000) led the program in its recruiting out of Woodinville, Washington; now, it is UW Associate Head Coach Leslie Tuiasosopo-Gabriel who has continued on as leadership of the Husky program. In these experimental years, Neville's swing hitters' offense was fashioned after the contemporaneous international men's game.

History

When McLaughlin took over the Washington program in 2001, the team was last in the Pac-10 Conference. In his first year at UW, he led the Huskies to an 11–16 record and a 4–14 mark in the Pac-10. The team's 11 wins in 2001 were the most for the program since 1997 (it had been '97 that UW made the NCAA Sweet Sixteen). Just one year later, the Huskies went 20–11 and made the NCAA second round. Since 2003, Washington has not won fewer than 23 matches or lost more than nine in any season.

In 2004, the Huskies won their first-ever Pac-10 title, and McLaughlin earned his first AVCA National Coach of the Year honor. In his fifth year at UW in 2005, he led the program to its only national title and a  record as Washington swept all six of their matches in the tournament, including top-ranked Nebraska in the final at the Alamodome in San Antonio. McLaughlin was named the Pac-10 Coach of the Year, and made history as the first coach in NCAA history to win a national championship in both men and women's volleyball, having led the USC men's team to a national title in 1990.

In 2006, he led UW to its third straight national semifinal, but the Dawgs fell to runner-up Stanford.

The NCAA Championships were hosted in Seattle at KeyArena at Seattle Center in 2013. The Huskies, led by AVCA National Player of the Year and Honda Award Winner Krista Vansant, won the Pac-12 title and reached the Final Four, but they fell in straight sets in the semifinals to eventual national champion Penn State.

There had been 35 All-Americans and 9 Academic All-Americans since McLaughlin's deeded arrival.

A young Coach Keegan's tenure has begun with the awarding of several All-Americans moreover, significantly, in Kara Bajema (c/o 2019), Lianna Sybeldon (consensus) and Courtney Schwan (uniquely, of the PNW).

Additionally, foremost, also distinctive of the Pacific Northwest (Portland, OR; Seattle-Tacoma, WA; Spokane, WA; Boise, ID), the program has been a national leading attendance draw. Their turnstile numbers consistently rank among top 10 averages.

Season-by-season results

Final Pac-10 season was 2010; became Pac-12 in 2011

Notable players
Melinda Beckenhauer 2x All-America (1988–89); 1st noteworthy transfer into the "U-District" from the University of Hawaii at Manoa
Leslie Gabriel (née Tuiasosopo); professional volleyball player post-BCS; current UW associate headcoach (2001–present)
Sanja Tomasevic 3x AVCA All-America (2003–05); 2005 Volleyball Magazine NCAA women's P.O.Y. Current Head Coach at Arizona State University.
Christal Morrison program's only 4x All-American (2004–07); current member of the Association of Volleyball Professionals
Courtney Thompson
Stevie Mussie 2006 Seattle Regional MVP; 2007 All-Pac10 1st Team selection. Coast-to-coast juniors' club and NCAA collegiate coach.
Jill Collymore 2009 all-star (Pac-10 Scholar Athlete of the Year, USAV Open MVP at Nationals (upwards U.S. A2 National Teams))   
Tamari Miyashiro 3x All-America (2007–09); current USA National Team libero
Bianca Rowland program's only non-Prepvolleyball.com Wa. Senior Ace athlete, out of Seattle's King's High School, to become AVCA All-American in 2011
Krista Vansant 3x All-American (2012–14); first Husky named AVCA P.O.Y. in 2013 and Academic All-American P.O.Y. in 2014 /to program's twice Honda Award winner following 2005's Courtney Thompson
Courtney Schwan 2x AVCA All-American, hailed from the South Puget Sound. All academic honors awardee, in the Pac-12, by her senior year (2017).
Kara Bajema 2x U.S. National All-American, from the USA-Canada Border as home. 2016 all Pac-12 & all Frosh (as a Blocker); and/to 2019 AVCA 1st Team all-American (as a Hitter).

Retired numbers
The program has retired two jersey numbers.

See also
List of NCAA Division I women's volleyball programs

References

External links